Aaron Bailey (born October 24, 1971) is an American former professional football player who was a wide receiver for five seasons with the Indianapolis Colts in the National Football League (NFL).

Bailey will be best remembered for what happened in the 1995 AFC Championship Game. Trailing the Pittsburgh Steelers 20–16 with time for one last play, quarterback Jim Harbaugh threw a Hail Mary pass that was tipped by #40 strong safety for Pittsburgh, Myron Bell. As Bailey was falling to the ground, the ball ended up in his arms but was knocked free by #29 Pittsburgh's cornerback, Randy Fuller, but for one brief moment, the ball still ended up on the chest of Aaron Bailey, but officials ruled that Bailey dropped the ball and the Steelers advanced to Super Bowl XXX. Bailey attended the same high school as Harbaugh's brother and future Baltimore Ravens head coach, John Harbaugh.
Bailey played for the Chicago Enforcers of the XFL in 2001 and in the Arena Football League (2001–2006).

Bailey's son, Amari, committed to playing college basketball for UCLA.

References

External links
 Just Sports Stats

1971 births
Living people
American football return specialists
American football wide receivers
Carolina Cobras players
Chicago Enforcers players
Grand Rapids Rampage players
Indianapolis Colts players
Louisville Cardinals football players
New Orleans VooDoo players
San Jose SaberCats players
Players of American football from Ann Arbor, Michigan
College of DuPage Chaparrals football players